The discography of Rancid, an American punk rock band, includes nine studio albums, two extended plays, two compilations and seventeen singles.

Biography
Rancid were formed in 1991 by vocalist and guitarist Tim Armstrong and bassist Matt Freeman, who then recruited drummer Brett Reed. The band signed to Lookout! Records, and released its first EP, Rancid, in 1992. Later that year, they signed to Epitaph Records (a label owned by then-former and now-current Bad Religion guitarist Brett Gurewitz) and released their self-titled debut album in 1993. While Rancid was writing a second album, Green Day's Billie Joe Armstrong, a friend of the band, joined them to co-write the song "Radio". This led to him playing a live show with the band. Armstrong eventually asked Billie Joe to become a member of the band, but he decided to continue playing in Green Day. Armstrong had previously asked Lars Frederiksen to be Rancid's second guitarist, but he turned down the request. After Billie Joe declined, Frederiksen changed his mind and decided to join Rancid, making them a four piece.

Frederiksen was present on Rancid's second album, Let's Go, which was released in 1994 and spawned the radio hit "Salvation", which reached number 21 on the modern rock charts. Its U.S. release date, June 14, 1994, was also Freeman's 28th birthday. That year their label-mates, The Offspring, experienced a huge success with their album Smash. The Offspring took Rancid on tour with them, and helped Let's Go make it to number 97 on Billboard's Heatseekers and Billboard 200 charts, respectively. With the success of the album Rancid were pursued by several major labels, including Madonna's Maverick Records, but the band eventually turned down the idea of signing to a different label and decided to just stay on Epitaph.

In August 1995, Rancid released their third album, ...And Out Come the Wolves. The critically acclaimed album, also the band's most successful, debuted at number 45 on the Billboard 200, produced three singles, "Roots Radicals", "Time Bomb", and "Ruby Soho", which all charted on the North American Billboard Modern Rock Tracks, and the band performed two of these songs on Saturday Night Live. ...And Out Come the Wolves has continued to sell consistently well since its release, and on January 22, 1996 was certified gold by the RIAA. It was also certified platinum on September 23, 2004.

In 1998, Rancid returned to the scene with their fourth album, Life Won't Wait. That album branched out from Rancid's previous musical styles, and combined punk rock with elements of roots reggae, rockabilly, dub, hip-hop, and funk. Due to this it was often compared to The Clash's Sandinista!. Although not as successful as ...And Out Come the Wolves, Life Won't Wait peaked at number 35 on the Billboard 200 album chart, the highest position the band had attained at the time. After its release, Rancid moved to Armstrong's vanity label (and subsidiary of Epitaph) Hellcat Records. That label would release their next album, 2000's Rancid (Skull Cover), which was not as successful as Rancid's previous three releases, but is considered the band's most hardcore offering to date, which was released as a follow up to the more ska and reggae oriented Life Won't Wait.

After the release of the Rancid (2000) album, Rancid went on hiatus while members were involved in their own projects. Frederiksen released a self-titled album with Lars Frederiksen and the Bastards in 2001 and Armstrong released an album with the Transplants a year later. Rancid released their sixth studio album, Indestructible, through joint distribution through Warner Bros. and Epitaph/Hellcat in August 2003. The album featured the hit song "Fall Back Down", and peaked at number 15, marking the highest initial charting album in Rancid's career. After the release of that album, Rancid went on hiatus again when all members decided to continue working on their projects.

After no activity at all in most of 2004 and 2005, Rancid reunited in 2006 to embark on a successful tour and played several acoustic sets as part of Hellcat Records' Hellcat Nights concert series at The Echo before Reed quit the band later that year. He was replaced by former Used drummer Branden Steineckert. Rancid released their long-awaited seventh studio album, Let the Dominoes Fall, on June 2, 2009 and was their first album of new material in six years. After a five-year wait and many delays, Rancid released their eight studio album, Honor Is All We Know in October 2014. That album was followed three years later by Trouble Maker (2017).

Studio albums

Split albums

Extended plays

Compilation albums

Singles

Video albums

Music videos

Compilation appearances
 "Brixton" - Rock Stars Kill 1994
 "Can't Forgive" - Land of Greed... World of Need (Embrace tribute) 1994
 "Hyena," "I Wanna Riot" - Punk-O-Rama Vol. 1 1994
 "I Wanna Riot (feat. Stubborn All-Stars)" - Beavis and Butt-Head Do America soundtrack 1996
 "Just a Feeling" - "Fat Music For Fat People" 1994
 "Sidekick" - Punk-O-Rama Vol. 2 1996
 "The Brothels" - Give 'Em the Boot 1997
 "The Harder They Come" - Tibetan Freedom Concert 1997
 "Rats in the Hallway" - Punk-O-Rama Vol. 3 1998
 "Brad Logan" - Chef Aid: The South Park Album 1998
 "Lethal" - Skaliente 1998
 "Cheat" - "Burning London: The Clash Tribute" 1999
 "Blacklisted" - Short Music for Short People 1999
 "If the Kids Are United" - Give 'Em the Boot II 1999
 "Misty Days" (Buju Banton w/ Rancid) - Give 'Em the Boot II 1999
 "Bruk Out" (Buccaneer w/ Rancid) - Give 'Em the Boot II 1999 
 "1998" - Punk-O-Rama Vol. 4 1999
 "No More Misty Days" (w/ Buju Banton) - Unchained Spirit 2000
 "Maxwell Murder" - Dave Mira Freestyle BMX Soundtrack 2000
 "Poison" - Punk-O-Rama Vol. 5 2000
 "It's Quite Alright" - Punk-O-Rama Vol. 6 2001
 "Golden Gate Fields" - Give 'Em the Boot III 2002
 "Bob" - Punk-O-Rama Vol. 7 2002
 "Sheena Is a Punk Rocker" - We're a Happy Family - A Tribute to Ramones 2003
 "Out of Control" - Need for Speed: Underground soundtrack 2003
 "As Wicked" - Punk-O-Rama Vol. 8 2003
 "Killing Zone" - Give 'Em the Boot IV 2004
 "Tropical London" - Punk-O-Rama Vol. 9 2004
 "Fall Back Down" - Tony Hawk's Underground 2 soundtrack 2004
 "White Knuckle Ride" - Punk-O-Rama Vol. 10 2005
 "Tattoo" - Give 'Em the Boot V 2006
 "Endrina" - Give 'Em the Boot VI 2007
 "Salvation" - Guitar Hero II soundtrack (appears as a cover made by the game producers, only in the Xbox 360 version) 2007
 "Fuck You" - Oi! This is Streetpunk, Volume Two 2012
 "Silence is the Only Rule" - Oi! Ain't Dead 5 - Rebellion Records 2016

Official live recordings
At the end of 2006, Rancid started selling official live recordings on their official website. The following shows from the Summer Tour of 2006 were professionally recorded and sold in mp3 and FLAC format.

 Live in Canada Recorded: December 9, 2006 Venue: Montreal
 Live in the UK Recorded: November 20, 2006 Venue: Brighton UK
 Live in the UK Recorded: November 19, 2006 Venue: Bristol UK
 Live in the UK Recorded: November 16, 2006 Venue: London, UK
 Live in the UK Recorded: November 13, 2006 Venue: Newcastle UK
 Live in the UK Recorded: November 12, 2006 Venue: Nottingham, UK
 Summer Tour 2006  	Recorded: October 16, 2006 Venue: Live from San Diego
 Summer Tour 2006 	Recorded: October 11, 2006 	Venue: Live from Anaheim
 Summer Tour 2006 	Recorded: October 6, 2006 	Venue: Live from Salt Lake City
 Summer Tour 2006 	Recorded: October 5, 2006 	Venue: Live from Salt Lake City
 Summer Tour 2006 	Recorded: October 1, 2006 	Venue: Live from Calgary
 Summer Tour 2006 	Recorded: September 13, 2006 	Venue: Live from Minneapolis
 Summer Tour 2006 	Recorded: September 12, 2006 	The House of Blues: Live from Chicago
 Summer Tour 2006 	Recorded: September 11, 2006 	The House of Blues: Live from Chicago
 Summer Tour 2006 	Recorded: September 9, 2006 	Venue: Live from Detroit
 Summer Tour 2006 	Recorded: September 8, 2006 	Venue: Live from Detroit
 Summer Tour 2006 	Recorded: September 7, 2006 	Venue: Live from Columbus
 Summer Tour 2006 	Recorded: September 6, 2006 	Venue: Live from Cleveland
 Summer Tour 2006 	Recorded: August 27, 2006 	Venue: Live from New York City
 Summer Tour 2006 	Recorded: August 26, 2006 	Venue: Live from New York City
 Summer Tour 2006 	Recorded: August 25, 2006 	Venue: Live from New York City
 Summer Tour 2006 	Recorded: August 24, 2006 	Venue: Live from New York City
 Summer Tour 2006 	Recorded: August 23, 2006 	Venue: Live from Boston
 Summer Tour 2006 	Recorded: August 20, 2006 	Venue: Live from Philadelphia
 Summer Tour 2006 	Recorded: August 19, 2006 	Venue: Live from Philadelphia
 Summer Tour 2006 	Recorded: August 18, 2006 	Venue: Live from Washington DC
 Summer Tour 2006 	Recorded: August 17, 2006 	Venue: Live from Washington DC
 Summer Tour 2006 	Recorded: August 16, 2006 	Venue: Live from Washington DC
 Summer Tour 2006 	Recorded: August 1, 2006 	Venue: Live from Albuquerue
 Summer Tour 2006 	Recorded: July 21, 2006 	Venue: Live from Miami
 Summer Tour 2006 	Recorded: July 19, 2006 	Venue: Live from Orlando

Notes

References

Discography
Punk rock group discographies
Discographies of American artists